Wola Drwińska  is a village in the administrative district of Gmina Drwinia, within Bochnia County, Lesser Poland Voivodeship, in southern Poland. Wawrzyniec Styczeń was born there.

References

Villages in Bochnia County